Gerhard Hilbrecht (2 April 1915 – 1 November 1996) was a German athlete. He competed in the men's discus throw at the 1936 Summer Olympics.

References

1915 births
1996 deaths
Athletes (track and field) at the 1936 Summer Olympics
German male discus throwers
Olympic athletes of Germany
Place of birth missing